Charles Raboisson (26 September 1889 – 11 May 1962) was a French racing cyclist. He finished in last place in the 1920 Tour de France.

References

External links

1889 births
1962 deaths
French male cyclists
People from Saint-Omer
Sportspeople from Pas-de-Calais
Cyclists from Hauts-de-France